Bias (Greek: Βίας ὁ Πριηνεύς; fl. 6th century BC) of Priene was a Greek sage. He is widely accepted as one of the Seven Sages of Greece and was renowned for his probity.

Life
Bias was born at Priene (modern-day Güllübahçe, Turkey), and was the son of Teutamus. He is said to have been distinguished for his skill as an advocate, and for his use of it in defence of the right. In reference to which Demodocus of Leros uttered the following saying: "If you are a judge, give a Prienian decision," and Hipponax said, "More powerful in pleading causes than Bias of Priene."

He was always reckoned among the Seven Sages, and was mentioned by Dicaearchus as one of the Four to whom alone that title was universally given, the remaining three being Thales, Pittacus, and Solon. Satyrus placed him at the head of the Seven Sages, and even Heraclitus, who poured scorn on figures such as Hesiod and Pythagoras, referred to Bias as "a man of more consideration than any." One of the examples of his great goodness is the legend that says that Bias paid a ransom for some women who had been taken prisoner. After educating them as his own daughters, he sent them back to Messina, their homeland, and to their fathers.

Bias is said to have died at a very advanced age while pleading a cause for his client. After he had finished speaking, he rested his head on his grandson. When the advocate on the opposite side had spoken, the judges decided in favor of Bias's client, by which time Bias had died. The city gave him a magnificent funeral and inscribed on his tomb:

Works
It is said that Bias wrote a poem of 2000 lines on Ionia and the way to make it prosperous.

Sayings
Many sayings were attributed to him by Diogenes Laërtius and by others:
"The naïve men are easily fooled."
"Most people are evil."
"All men are wicked."
"It is difficult to bear a change of fortune for the worse with magnanimity."
"Choose the course which you adopt with deliberation; but when you have adopted it, then persevere in it with firmness."
"Do not speak fast, for that shows folly."
"Love prudence."
"Speak of the Gods as they are."
"Do not praise an undeserving man because of his riches."
"Gain your point by persuasion, not by force." / "Take by persuasion, not by force."
"Cherish wisdom as a means of traveling from youth to old age, for it is more lasting than any other possession."
 "So order your affairs as if you were to live long, or die soon."
 "I carry all my effects with me."
 "They love as if they would one day hate, and hate as if they would one day love."
 "Office will show a man."

Vatican bust
In April, 1819, Schopenhauer wrote in his Reisebuch [Travel Diary]: "In the Vatican [Hall of Philosophers] there is the bust of Bias with the inscription of πλεῖστοι ἄνθρωποι κακοί [most men are bad]. Indeed this must have been his maxim."

Notes

References

Further reading

6th-century BC Greek people
Seven Sages of Greece